Bolkow station is a Via Rail request stop station on the Sudbury – White River train. It is located in the unincorporated place of Bolkow in the northwest corner of the Unorganized North Part of Sudbury District, Ontario, Canada.

References

External links
Via Rail page for Bolkow train station

Via Rail stations in Ontario
Railway stations in Sudbury District
Canadian Pacific Railway stations in Ontario